{{Infobox writer  
| name             = Yogesh Joshi
| image            = 
| caption          = 
| native_name      = યોગેશ ભાનુપ્રસાદ જોશી
| native_name_lang = guj
| birth_name       = Yogesh Bhanuprasad Joshi
| birth_date       = 
| birth_place      = Mahesana, Gujarat, India
| occupation       = Poet, short story writer, novelist, editor
| language         = Gujarati
| education        = Master of Science
| alma_mater       = Gujarat University
| period           = Postmodern Gujarati literature
| genres           = Short story, novel, free verse, Ghazal
| movement         = 
| notableworks     = 
 Avaajnu Ajavalu (1984)
 Samudi (1984)
 Motiba (1998)
 Adhakhuli Baari (2001)
| spouse           = Rashmi Joshi (1981 - present)
| children         = 
| awards           = * Narmad Suvarna Chandrak (1998)
 Ushnas Prize (2006-07)
| signature        = Author Yogesh Joshi Autograph1.svg
| years_active     = 1968 - present
}}

Yogesh Joshi (Gujarati: યોગેશ જોશી) is a Gujarati language poet, short story writer, novelist, and editor from Gujarat, India. He is an editor of Parab, a publication of Gujarati Sahitya Parishad. His significant works include Avaajnu Ajavalu (1984; Collection of poems), Samudi (1984; Novel), Motiba (1998; Biography) and Adhakhuli Baari (2001; Collection of Short stories). He was awarded the Narmad Suvarna Chandrak award for his book Motiba.

 Early life 
Joshi was born on 3 July 1955 in Mahesana, Gujarat to Bhanuprasad Joshi and Anilabahen Joshi. He completed his schooling from G.D. High School Visnagar in 1971. He received his B. Sc. from M.N. College, Visnagar in 1974 and M. Sc. in Physics from the School of Sciences, Gujarat University in 1976.

Joshi married Rashmi on 22 January 1981. His son, Maulik Joshi, was born in 1981, and his daughter, Kruti, was born in 1984. He currently lives in Ahmedabad.

 Career 
Joshi started his career as a junior engineer at the Department of Telecommunications, Government of India in 1979. In 2000, he joined Bharat Sanchar Nigam Limited and served there until 2015 as a sub-divisional and divisional engineer and then deputy general manager.

Joshi started to write poems during his school days. During college he ventured in to other genres of literature such as drama and short story. In 1976, his writing was published for the first time in Bhumika, a Gujarati literary magazine edited by Aniruddh Brahmbhatt which was later published as Kimapi. Since 2002, he has served as an editor of Parab, a publication of Gujarati Sahitya Parishad.

 Works Avaajnu Ajavalu, his first anthology of poems, was published in 1984, followed by Tejna Chaas (1991). His first novel Samudi was published in 1984, followed by Jivtar (1987), Nahitar (1991), Aarpaar (1992), Vaastu (2001) and Bhina Pagla (2004). Hajiye Ketlun Door? (1993) and Adhakhuli Baari (2001) are his short stories collections while Motiba was a biography. His collection of essays was published as Antahpur in 2002. His selected short stories have been compiled as Yogesh Joshi Ni Shreshtha Vartao by Harsh Brahmbhatt and Urmila Thakar in 2008. Mrutyuni Samipe (1987) and Patangni Pankhe (1989) are his translations.

 Children's works 
 Patangni Pankhe (1989)
 Kesoodano Rang (1990)
 Rasaprad Bodhkathao (2001; Vol. 4 to 6)
 Ramayan Na Amar Patro (2002; Vol. 1 to 4)
 Mahabharat Na Amar Patro (2002; Vol. 1 to 5)
 Panchatantra (2002; Vol. 1 to 5)
 Hitopadesh (2002; Vol. 1 to 5)
 Isapniti (2002; Vol. 1 to 5)
 Tenaliram (2003; Vol. 1 to 6)
 Mulla Nasruddin (2003; Vol. 1 to 5)
 Vikram-Vetal (2004; Vol. 1 to 5)
 Sinhasan Batrisi (2005; Vol. 1 to 5)

 Compilations 
 Gurjar Adyatan Kavyasanchay (1998; with Chandrakant Sheth and Shraddha Trivedi)
 Gurjar Geetsanchay (1998; with Chandrakant Sheth and Shraddha Trivedi)
 Gurjar Pranay Kavyasanchay (1998; with Chandrakant Sheth and Shraddha Trivedi)
 Gurjar Ghazalsanchay (1998; with Chandrakant Sheth)
 Gujarati Navlikachayan : 1999 (2001; selected short stories published during the year)
 Vismi Sadini Gujarati Kavyamudra (2007; with Chandrakant Sheth, Harsh Brahmbhatt and Urmila Thakar)

 Recognition 
He won Narmad Suvarna Chandrak (1998) for his book Motiba. His short story collections Hajiye Ketlun Door (1993) and Adhakhuli Baari (2001) have been awarded by Gujarat Sahitya Akademi. He won the Govardhanram Tripathi Prize, Ghanshyamdas Saraf Sahitya Puraskar and Gujarat Sahitya Akademi Best Book Prize for his novel Vaastu. Vaastu was also awarded the Priyakant Parikh Prize of Gujarati Sahitya Parishad in 2001. His essay collection Antahpur (2002) was awarded by Kalagurjari Sanstha, Mumbai. His work Jesalmer'' (series of poems) was awarded the Ushnas Prize (2006–07). He is also a recipient of Dhanji Kanji Gandhi Suvarna Chandrak (1999).

See also
 List of Gujarati-language writers

References 

1955 births
Living people
Poets from Gujarat
Indian male short story writers
Gujarati-language writers
Indian male poets
Gujarati-language poets
People from Ahmedabad district
People from Mehsana district
Indian magazine editors
Indian male novelists
20th-century Indian short story writers
20th-century Indian poets
20th-century Indian novelists
Novelists from Gujarat
20th-century Indian male writers